Godfrey Brunner (29 July 1921 – April 2003) was a Canadian sports shooter. He competed in the 25 metre pistol and 50 metre pistol events at the 1960 Summer Olympics.

References

1921 births
2003 deaths
Canadian male sport shooters
Olympic shooters of Canada
Shooters at the 1960 Summer Olympics
Place of birth missing
Pan American Games medalists in shooting
Pan American Games bronze medalists for Canada
Shooters at the 1959 Pan American Games
20th-century Canadian people
21st-century Canadian people